Copper Island is a local name for the northern part of the Keweenaw Peninsula in northern Michigan, United States.

Copper Island may also refer to:
 Copper Island, an island in Lake Superior offshore from the hamlet of Rossport, Ontario, east of an eight island archipelago owned by the Nature Conservancy of Canada
 Medny Island, an island in the North Pacific (one of the Komandorski Islands) located near Attu at the western end of the Aleutian Islands
 Copper Island Aleut, a dialect (also known as Medny Aleut) of the Aleut language
 Copper Island, an island in Shuswap Lake, British Columbia, Canada